The South Fork John Day River is a  tributary of the John Day River in the U.S. state of Oregon. Along the way, the stream passes through the abandoned town of Izee. The Black Canyon Wilderness in the Ochoco National Forest lies within the river's drainage basin.

See also
List of rivers of Oregon
List of longest streams of Oregon
List of National Wild and Scenic Rivers

References

External links
 
 National Wild and Scenic Rivers System

Rivers of Oregon
Wild and Scenic Rivers of the United States
Rivers of Harney County, Oregon
Rivers of Grant County, Oregon